Tribeca or TriBeCa may refer to:

Places
 Tribeca, a neighborhood in Manhattan, New York City, in the United States
 Tribeca Belfast, an urban redevelopment project in Belfast, Northern Ireland

Media
 TriBeCa (TV series), dramatic anthology series produced by Robert De Niro and Jane Rosenthal
 Tribeca Film Festival, film festival founded in 2002
 TriBeCa Productions, a film and TV production company
 Angie Tribeca, an American comedy television series

Other
 Subaru Tribeca, a sport utility vehicle
 Tribeca Poker Network
 Tribeca (restaurant), restaurant with two Michelin stars in Heeze, The Netherlands